Gulf World Marine Park is a dolphinarium located in Panama City Beach, Florida. It has been open since 1970, and is one of only a few institutes in the United States to house rough-toothed dolphins.

History
Gulf World Marine Park was founded in 1969 by a group of five Alabama businessmen, and they announced their plans to build the park in September of that year.   The park's first dolphins, four bottlenose dolphins captured nearby in the Gulf of Mexico, were housed at a motel pool for training. They were moved to Gulf World in the spring of 1970.  Gulf World Marine Park opened to the public on Memorial Day of 1970. In 2000, the park underwent an expansion.  In 2015, Gulf World Marine Park was acquired by the Dolphin Discovery group, a company that owns a number of swim-with dolphins facilities.

Exhibits

 Dolphin Stadium: Currently houses 12 bottlenose dolphins. The dolphins perform scheduled shows at the stadium, and visitors can pay extra for an up-close encounter with them, or to swim with them. As of October 20th, 2021, the dolphin show has been suspended while renovations are made. 
 Penguin Habitat: Features African penguins. Visitors can pay extra for an up-close encounter with them.
 Seal Habitat: Features harbor seals. Visitors can pay extra for an up-close encounter with them.
 Sea Lion Stadium: Features California sea lions, which perform in scheduled shows daily. Visitors can pay extra for an up-close encounter with them. The park's four rough-toothed dolphins are also housed here.
 Stingray Bay: Houses two species of stingray, cownose rays and Southern stingrays. Visitors can touch and feed the stingrays.
 Tortoise Habitat: Features African spurred tortoises.
 Tropical Garden Theater: Stadium in which the park's Feathers and Friends Show is held. The show consists of performances from domestic dogs and cats, as well as a variety of birds and reptiles. The majority of these animals are rescues.

References

Zoos in Florida
Aquaria in Florida
1970 establishments in Florida